Haplogroup P1, also known as P-M45 and K2b2a, is a Y-chromosome DNA haplogroup in human genetics. Defined by the SNPs M45 and PF5962, P1 is a primary branch (subclade) of P (P-P295; K2b2).

The only primary subclades of P1 are Haplogroup Q (Q-M242) and Haplogroup R (R-M207). These haplogroups now comprise most of the male lineages among Native Americans, Europeans, Central Asia and South Asia, among other parts of the world.

P1 (M45) likely originated in Central Asia or Siberia, with basal P1*  (P1xQ,R) now most common among individuals in Siberia and Central Asia. A 2018 study found basal P1* in two Siberian individuals dated to the Upper Paleolithic (~31,630 cal BP) from a Yana river archaeological site known as Yana RHS.

Structure 

The subclades of Haplogroup P1 with their defining mutation, according to the 2016 ISOGG tree:

 P1 (M45/PF5962)
Q (M242)
 Q1 (L232/S432)
R (M207, P224, P227, P229, P232, P280, P285, L248.2, V45)
R1 (M173/P241/Page29)
R2 (M479/PF6107)

Modern distribution

P1* 
The modern populations with high frequencies of P1* (or P1xQ,R) are located in Central Asia and Eastern Siberia:
 35.4% among Tuvan males;
 35% among Nivkh and;
 28.3% among Altai-Kizhi.

Modern South Asian populations also feature P1 (M45) at low to moderate frequencies. In South Asia, P-M45 is most frequent among the Muslims of Manipur (Pangal, 33%), but this may be due to a very small sample size (nine individuals).

A levels of 14% P-M45* on the island of Korčula in Dalmatia (modern Croatia) and 6% on the neighbouring island of Hvar, may be linked to immigration during the early medieval period, by Central Asian peoples such as the Avars.

It is possible that many cases of haplogroup P1 reported in Central Asia, South Asia and/or West Asia are members of rare or less-researched subclades of haplogroups R2 and Q, rather than P1* per se.

§ May include members of haplogroup R2. 
† May include members of haplogroup R1*/R1a*

Q
Near universal in the Kets (95%) of Siberia. Very common in pre-modern Native American populations, except for the Na-Dene peoples, where it reaches 50-90%.

Also common, at 25-50%, in modern Siberian populations such as the Nivkhs, Selkups, Tuvans, Chukchi, Siberian Eskimos, Northern Altaians, and in 30% of Turkmens.

R
The only discovered case of basal R* (i.e. one that does not belong to R1 or R2) is the Mal'ta Boy.

Subclades of R1b, R1a and R2 are now dominant in various populations from Europe to South Asia.

References

Sources

External links
Spread of Haplogroup P, from The Genographic Project, National Geographic''

P1